German submarine U-960 was a Type VIIC U-boat built for Nazi Germany's Kriegsmarine for service during World War II.
She was laid down on 20 March 1942 by Blohm & Voss, Hamburg as yard number 160, launched on 3 December 1942 and commissioned on 28 January 1943 under Oberleutnant zur See Günther Heinrich.

Design
German Type VIIC submarines were preceded by the shorter Type VIIB submarines. U-960 had a displacement of  when at the surface and  while submerged. She had two shafts and two  propellers.

U-960 was fitted with five  torpedo tubes (four fitted at the bow and one at the stern), fourteen torpedoes, one  SK C/35 naval gun, 220 rounds, and one twin  C/30 anti-aircraft gun. The boat had a complement of between forty-four and sixty.

Service history
The boat's career began with training at 5th U-boat Flotilla on 28 January 1943, followed by active service on 1 August 1943 as part of the 3rd Flotilla for the remainder of her service.

Wolfpacks
U-960 took part in five wolfpacks, namely:
 Wiking (20 September – 3 October 1943)
 Coronel 1 (15 – 17 December 1943)
 Amrum (18 – 23 December 1943)
 Rügen 4 (23 – 28 December 1943)
 Rügen 3 (28 – 31 December 1943)

Fate

Summary of raiding history

See also
 Mediterranean U-boat Campaign (World War II)

References

Notes

Citations

Bibliography

External links

German Type VIIC submarines
1942 ships
U-boats commissioned in 1943
U-boats sunk in 1944
U-boats sunk by depth charges
U-boats sunk by US warships
World War II shipwrecks in the Mediterranean Sea
World War II submarines of Germany
Ships built in Hamburg
Maritime incidents in May 1944